Maurice Morton (3 June 1913 – 23 March 1994) was a polymer author, educator, and researcher.  He was the first director of the University of Akron's Institute of Rubber Research, which in 1993 was renamed the Maurice Morton Institute of Polymer Science.

Personal 

Morton was born the Russian Empire on 3 June 1913.  Due to political instability following World War I, Morton's family moved from Latvia to Canada, settling in Montreal.  Some of his earliest memories were of gunfire when the Russian Revolution began in St. Petersburg. He attended college at McGill University.  He married Lilian Rosenbloom in 1933.  The two were married for sixty years, until her death in 1993. Morton emigrated to the United States in 1948, to take a position at the University of Akron, where he would remain for his career.  Morton had three children, Jay Dennis, John Alex, and Ruth.

Education 

 1934 - BA Chemistry at McGill University
 1945 - PhD Chemistry, McGill University on the topic of emulsion copolymerization of butadiene-styrene (SBR) rubber.

Career 

 1936 - 1941 Chief Chemist - Johns Manville, Quebec
 1941 - 1944 Chief Chemist - Congoleum Canada, Montreal
 1945 - 1948 Assistant Professor and department head at Concordia University
 1948 - hired by George S. Whitby as assistant director of rubber research for the U. S. Government Rubber Research Program's at the University of Akron.  Some of his first accomplishments were the design and execution of experiments to confirm theories developed by Paul J. Flory.  
 1952 - upon retirement of Prof. Whitby, the university appointed Morton as the first Professor of Polymer Chemistry, and assistant director of the chemistry department.  
 1956 - founded the Ph.D. program in Polymer Chemistry at the university's Institute of Rubber Research
 1962 - served as chairman of the ACS Division of Polymer Chemistry. 
 1993 - retired as Regents Professor Emeritus of Polymer Chemistry

Morton held three patents in polymer chemistry.  He wrote more than 100 technical articles over his career, as well as widely used texts.

Awards and Recognitions

 1979 - Colwyn medal of the Plastics and Rubber Institute of Great Britain
 1985 - Charles Goodyear Medal from the ACS Rubber Division
 1988 - Paul J. Flory Polymer Education Award
 1990 - Médaille de la Ville de Paris
 1991 - Honorary Doctorate, University of Akron
 1994 - International Rubber Science Hall of Fame

References 

Polymer scientists and engineers
1913 births
1994 deaths
U.S. Synthetic Rubber Program
University of Akron faculty
Latvian emigrants to Canada
Canadian emigrants to the United States